The British League Division Two was created in 1968 and was the second tier of speedway racing in the United Kingdom until the restructuring of British speedway in 1995. It was renamed the New National League in 1975 and the National League between 1976 and 1990.

History
After the formation of the British League in 1965, riders wanting to break into teams found it more difficult to do so. The idea of forming a second division was suggested and in 1968 the idea became a reality when ten teams formed the league. The ten teams were: Belle Vue Colts, Berwick Bandits, Canterbury Crusaders, Crayford Highwaymen, Middlesbrough Teessiders, Nelson Admirals, Plymouth Devils, Rayleigh Rockets, Reading Racers and the Weymouth Eagles.

The league was renamed the New National League (to avoid confusion with the original National League) in 1975 after promoters of the Division Two tracks decided to form their own league after they became dissatisfied with the way the league was being run by the British Speedway Promoters' Association and the name was shortened to the National League in 1976. It was again named the British League Division Two in 1991 and a system of promotion and relegation was introduced between the British League and the British League Division Two. The league existed until 1994 when the top two league divisions of speedway in the UK were amalgamated for the 1995 and 1996 seasons. In 1997 the Premier League became the second tier when the Elite League was formed.

Champions

See also
 List of United Kingdom Speedway League Champions

References

Speedway leagues
Speedway competitions in the United Kingdom